Kemerhisar railway station is a railway station near the town of Kemerhisar in the Niğde Province of Turkey. Kemerhisar station consists of a side platform serving one track.

TCDD Taşımacılık operates a daily intercity train, the Erciyes Express, from Kayseri to Adana.

References

External links
TCDD Taşımacılık
Passenger trains
Station timetable

Railway stations in Niğde Province